Marie Prevost (born Marie Bickford Dunn; November 8, 1896 – January 21, 1937) was a Canadian-born film actress. During her 20-year career, she made 121 silent and sound films.

Prevost began her career during the silent film era. She was discovered by Mack Sennett who signed her to contract and made her one of his "Bathing Beauties" in the late 1910s. Prevost appeared in dozens of Sennett's short comedy films before moving on to feature-length films for Universal. In 1922, she signed with Warner Bros. where her career flourished as a leading lady. She was a favorite of director Ernst Lubitsch who cast her in three of his comedy films: The Marriage Circle (1924), Three Women (1924) and Kiss Me Again (1925).

After being let go by Warner Bros in early 1926, Prevost's career began to decline and she was relegated to secondary roles. She was also beset with personal problems, including the death of her mother in 1926 and the breakdown of her marriage to actor Kenneth Harlan in 1927, which fueled her depression. She began to abuse alcohol and binge eat, resulting in a weight gain that made it difficult for her to secure acting jobs. By 1935, Prevost was only able to secure bit parts in films. She made her last onscreen appearance in 1936.

After years of drinking, Prevost died of acute alcoholism at the age of 40 in January 1937. Prevost's estate was valued at $300 since she had squandered most of her earnings. Her death prompted the Hollywood community to create the Motion Picture & Television Country House and Hospital.

Early life
Prevost was born in Sarnia, Ontario, to Hughina Marion (née Bickford) and Arthur "Teddy" Dunn. Her father worked as a railroad conductor. When she was an infant, Teddy Dunn was killed when gas seeped into the St. Clair Tunnel. Hughina later married Frank Prevost and the family moved to Denver. In 1900, Hughina gave birth to another daughter, Marjorie, called Peg. Marie's stepfather, who worked as a miner and surveyor, frequently moved the family around the country following up on various get-rich-quick schemes. After living in Ogden, Utah; Reno, Nevada; and Fresno, California, the family finally settled in Los Angeles. Hughina and Frank Prevost later divorced. Frank Prevost died in September 1933 and bequeathed Marie $1.

While living in Los Angeles, Prevost attended Manual Arts High School. By 1915, Prevost landed a job as a secretary at a law firm which represented the Keystone Film Company. While running an office errand at the Keystone Studios, Prevost was asked to appear in a bit part for the film His Father's Footsteps. Mack Sennett, Keystone's owner, was impressed by Prevost's performance and sent word that he wanted to see Prevost in his office. Prevost later recalled the day to Motion Picture World magazine: "I asked for Mr. Sennett and was ushered in right away. He looked very stern as I walked into his office. I was ready to cry. Suddenly, he smiled. 'I want your signature today. Sign right here.' I suddenly realized the paper he pushed in front of me was a contract. I was to be one of his Sennett Bathing Beauties. Best of all I was to be paid $15 a week. I signed without reading a word. Fifteen dollars was a lot of money."

As her career was beginning to rise, Prevost married socialite Henry Charles "Sonny" Gerke in June 1918. The couple soon separated, and Prevost kept news of the marriage a secret.

Career

Early years

Initially cast in minor comedic roles as the sexy, innocent young girl, she worked in numerous films for Sennett's studio. In 1919, Sennett cast Prevost in her first lead role in Yankee Doodle in Berlin. The film was a hit and helped to solidify Prevost's career. She scored another success in the 1920 romantic film Love, Honor, and Behave, opposite George O'Hara, another newcomer and Sennett protégé. By 1921, Prevost wanted to move to another studio, later stating that she left Keystone because Sennett was only interested in making money and was unconcerned with creativity. Director King Baggot helped secure her a contract with Universal for $1,000 per week. Prevost was released from her contract with Keystone, and she signed with Universal in 1921.

At Universal, Irving Thalberg took an interest in Prevost and became determined to make her a star. Thalberg ensured that she received a great deal of publicity and staged numerous events which put her in the public spotlight. After announcing that he had selected two films in which Prevost would star, The Moonlight Follies (1921) and Kissed (1922), Thalberg sent Prevost to Coney Island where she burned her bathing suit to symbolize the end of her bathing beauty days.

Stardom
While at Universal, Prevost still was relegated to light comedies. After her contract expired, Jack L. Warner signed her to a two-year contract at $1,500 per week at Warner Bros. in 1922. During this time, Prevost was dating actor Kenneth Harlan. Jack Warner also had signed Harlan to a contract and cast the couple in the lead roles in F. Scott Fitzgerald's The Beautiful and Damned. To publicize the film, Warner announced that the couple would marry on the film's set. The publicity stunt worked, and thousands of fans sent gifts and letters to the couple. In August 1923, Sonny Gerke, Prevost's first husband filed for divorce. The Los Angeles Mirror got wind that Prevost still was married and ran a story with the headline "Marie Prevost Will Be a Bigamist if She Marries Kenneth Harlan". Warner was livid over the negative publicity and Prevost's failure to disclose her first marriage despite the fact that the publicity stunt was his idea.

In spite of the bad publicity, Prevost's performance in The Beautiful and Damned brought good reviews. Director Ernst Lubitsch chose her for a major role opposite Adolphe Menjou in 1924's The Marriage Circle. Of her performance as the beautiful seductress, Lubitsch said that she was one of the few actresses in Hollywood who knew how to underplay comedy to achieve the maximum effect. This performance, praised by The New York Times, resulted in Lubitsch casting her in Three Women in 1924 and in Kiss Me Again the following year.

In early 1926, Warner Bros. decided to not renew Prevost and Harlan's contracts (the two quietly married in 1924 after Prevost's divorce was finalized). Shortly after she was dismissed by Warner Bros., Prevost's mother Hughina died in an automobile accident in Lordsburg, New Mexico on February 5, 1926. Hughina had been traveling to Palm Beach, Florida with actress Vera Steadman and Hollywood studio owner Al Christie when their vehicle overturned. Hughina was crushed by the vehicle and died at the scene. Steadman and Christie sustained serious injuries, but survived.

Actress Phyllis Haver, who had been friends with Prevost since her bathing beauty days, later stated in an interview that she believed the loss of Prevost and Harlan's contracts with Warner Bros. caused problems in the marriage and was one of the causes of Prevost's alcoholism.

Decline
Devastated by the loss of her only remaining parent, Prevost began drinking heavily and developed an addiction to alcohol. Prevost tried to get past her personal torment by burying herself in her work, starring in numerous roles as the temptingly beautiful seductress who in the end was always the honorable heroine. Adding to her depression was the end of her marriage to Kenneth Harlan – the two separated in 1927.

After seeing Prevost in The Beautiful and Damned, Howard Hughes cast her as the lead in The Racket (1928). Hughes and Prevost later had a brief affair. After the affair ended, Prevost was heartbroken which furthered her depression. Her role in The Racket proved to be Prevost's last leading role.

Prevost's depression caused her to binge on food resulting in significant weight gain. Her career continued but she was relegated to secondary roles. In 1929, Cecil B. DeMille offered her a co-starring role in his final silent film The Godless Girl, starring Lina Basquette. In her 1990 autobiography, Basquette recalled that Prevost was not outwardly bitter about losing her leading lady status, stating "Aw, hell, that's the way it is." Prevost received generally good reviews for her role in the film. The following year, she signed a contract with Metro-Goldwyn-Mayer.

While at MGM, Prevost worked steadily but was offered only secondary parts. In 1930, she appeared in Paid, starring Joan Crawford. While Prevost's role was secondary, she garnered good reviews. In 1931, she played Academy Award winner Helen Hayes' loyal friend in The Sin of Madelon Claudet. In 1932, she was one of the three leads in the film Three Wise Girls, starring Jean Harlow. By 1934, she had no work at all, and her financial situation deteriorated dramatically. The downward spiral became aggravated when her weight problems forced her into repeated crash dieting to keep whatever bit part a movie studio offered. Prevost made her last on screen appearance in a bit part as a waitress in Ten Laps to Go (1936).

Personal life

Prevost was married twice with both marriages ending in divorce. Her first marriage was to socialite Henry Charles "Sonny" Gerke in June 1918. The marriage was not known to the public until Gerke filed for divorce in August 1923 citing desertion. Gerke claimed that the marriage was kept a secret because Prevost feared it would damage her budding acting career. News of the marriage was revealed shortly after Jack L. Warner devised a publicity stunt in which he claimed that Prevost and her The Beautiful and Damned co-star Kenneth Harlan would marry on the film's set in real life. To avoid negative publicity, Prevost did not fight the divorce. In an interview with the Los Angeles Times, Prevost admitted that she and Gerke married on a whim and had separated shortly after marrying. She also stated that she and Gerke had remained friendly and dated on occasion. Gerke's divorce petition was granted in October 1923.

In October 1924, Prevost married actor Kenneth Harlan. The two starred in several films together, including The Beautiful and the Damned and Bobbed Hair. Prevost and Harlan separated in May 1927, and Prevost filed for divorce. Later that year, she was granted an interlocutory divorce. However, the couple reconciled in June 1928. The reconciliation proved to be brief and their divorce was finalized in January 1929.

Death
On January 21, 1937, Prevost died of acute alcoholism at the age of 40. Her body was not discovered until January 23 after neighbors complained about her dog's incessant barking. A houseboy found her body after entering her room. Police found several empty liquor bottles in the room along with a promissory note to Joan Crawford for $110.

Her funeral (which was paid for by Joan Crawford) at the Hollywood Memorial Cemetery was attended by Crawford, Clark Gable, Wallace Beery, Douglas Fairbanks Jr., Mack Sennett, and Barbara Stanwyck. Prevost's sister had her remains cremated and combined them with those of their mother, who had died in 1926.

In February 1937, it was discovered that Prevost's estate was valued at $300. Prevost's fate as well as that of others prompted the Hollywood community to create the Motion Picture & Television Country House and Hospital to provide medical care for employees of the television and motion picture industry.

For her contribution to the motion picture industry, Marie Prevost has a star on the Hollywood Walk of Fame at 6201 Hollywood Boulevard.

Filmography

In popular culture
 Prevost's death was featured in the book Hollywood Babylon by Kenneth Anger. In the book, Anger claims Prevost's dog consumed her remains over the ensuing days to survive. However, Anger's claims that Prevost's dog made "mincemeat out of his mistress" are false. While Prevost's pet dachshund Maxie did bite her legs in an effort to wake her, the dog did not attempt to eat her body.
 Nick Lowe's song "Marie Provost" (sic) from the 1978 album Jesus of Cool details her life and Anger's account of her death. The song includes the lyric in the chorus "She was a winner/that became the doggie's dinner".
 In 2019, novelist Laini Giles released Bathing Beauty, a novel that details her life.

See also
Canadian pioneers in early Hollywood

References

Works cited

 Anger, Kenneth (1975). Hollywood Babylon. Bell Publishing Company.
 Ankerich, Michael G. (2010). Dangerous Curves atop Hollywood Heels: The Lives, Careers, and Misfortunes of 14 Hard-Luck Girls of the Silent Screen. BearManor. .
 Dumaux, Sally A. (2002). King Baggot: A Biography and Filmography of the First King of the Movies. McFarland. 
 Golden, Eve; King, Bob (2001). Golden Images: 41 Essays on Silent Film Stars. McFarland. 
 Foster, Charles (2000). Stardust and Shadows: Canadians in Early Hollywood. Dundurn Press Ltd. .
 Petrucelli, Alan W. (2009). Morbid Curiosity: The Disturbing Demises of the Famous and Infamous (1 ed.), Perigee Trade,

External links

 Photographs and literature

1896 births
1937 deaths
20th-century American actresses
Actresses from Ontario
Alcohol-related deaths in California
American film actresses
American silent film actresses
Canadian emigrants to the United States
Canadian film actresses
Canadian silent film actresses
Metro-Goldwyn-Mayer contract players
People from Sarnia
Warner Bros. contract players
20th-century Canadian actresses